Laurent Nkunda (or Laurent Nkundabatware Mihigo (birth name), or Laurent Nkunda Batware, or as he prefers to be called The Chairman; born February 2, 1967) is a former General in the Armed Forces of the Democratic Republic of Congo (DRC) and is the former warlord (leader of a rebel faction) operating in the province of Nord-Kivu, sympathetic to Congolese Tutsis and the Tutsi-dominated government of neighbouring Rwanda. Nkunda, who is himself a Congolese Tutsi, commanded the former DRC troops of the 81st and 83rd Brigades of the DRC Army. He speaks English, French, Swahili, Kinyarwanda, Lingala and Kinande. On January 22, 2009, he was put under house arrest in Gisenyi when he was called for a meeting to plan a joint operation between the Congolese and Rwandan militaries.

Personal life
Nkunda has six children. Before joining the military, Nkunda studied psychology at Kisangani  University then became a school teacher in Kichanga. He has claimed to admire leaders including Gandhi and George W. Bush.

Religious beliefs
Nkunda claims to be a Seventh-day Adventist minister. But Nkunda is really a Pentecostal Christian. He says that most of his troops have converted. In the 2008 documentary Blood Coltan about the real costs of mobile phones, Nkunda proudly shows a button he wears that reads "Rebels for Christ." He also claims to receive help and guidance from American "Rebels for Christ" who visit the Congo spreading Pentecostal Christianity. The Seventh-day Adventist Church has denied Nkunda's claims of being a pastor and member of the church. At times he has visited the church.

Political and military career

Rwandan Genocide 1994–1995
During the Rwandan genocide, the former psychology student traveled to Rwanda, joining the Tutsi Rwandan Patriotic Front (RPF) who were fighting against the Rwandan Armed Forces (FAR), the military of the genocidal Hutu-led government.

First Congo War 1996–1998
After the RPF defeated the FAR to become the new government of Rwanda, Nkunda returned to the DRC. During the First Congo War, he fought alongside Laurent-Désiré Kabila, who overthrew Mobutu.

Second Congo War 2000–2003
At the outset of the Second Congo War, Nkunda joined and became a major in the Congolese Rally for Democracy also known as Rally for Congolese Democracy (RCD), fighting on the side of Rwandan, Ugandan, Burundian, and other Tutsi-aligned forces (the latter are a relatively small group in the DRC, numbering between half a million to a million, but are a significant military force who live just across the border from Rwanda).

Army career and rebellion 2007
In 2003, with the official end to war, Nkunda joined the new integrated national army of the Transitional Government of the Democratic Republic of the Congo as a colonel and by 2004, he was promoted to general. However, he soon rejected the authority of the government and retreated with some of the RCD-Goma troops to the Masisi forests in North Kivu, where he raised the flag of rebellion against the government of Joseph Kabila (who had succeeded his father in 2001). Nkunda claimed to be defending the interests of the Tutsi minority in eastern Congo who were subjected to attacks by Hutus who had fled after their involvement with the Rwandan genocide. This war has come to be known as the Kivu conflict.

Forming a government
In August 2007, the area under Nkunda's control lay north of Lake Kivu in Nord-Kivu in the territories of Masisi and Rutshuru. In this area, Nkunda established his headquarters by building necessary infrastructure and developing institutions of order. He established a political organisation known as the National Congress for the Defence of the People (CNDP).

2008 Nord-Kivu fighting

In fighting that began on 27 October 2008, known as the 2008 Nord-Kivu fighting, Nkunda led CNDP rebels who opposed both the army of the Democratic Republic of Congo, FDLR militias, and United Nations forces of the 17,000 UN contingent in the country. It was reported that he was advancing on the city of Goma with the aim of capturing it, with the Congolese army claimed he was receiving aid from Rwanda.

The fighting uprooted 200,000 civilians, bringing the total number of people displaced by the Kivu conflict to 2 million, causing civil unrest large food shortages and what the United Nations calls "a humanitarian crisis of catastrophic dimensions."

In an interview with the BBC on November 10, 2008, Nkunda threatened to topple the government of the Democratic Republic of Congo if the president, Joseph Kabila, continued to avoid direct negotiations.

Human rights
Throughout the years Nkunda has come under scrutiny and been accused by a number of organizations of committing human rights abuses. Nkunda was indicted by the Congolese government for war crimes in September 2005.

According to human rights monitors such as Refugees International, Nkunda's troops have been alleged to have committed acts of murder, rape, and pillaging of civilian villages; a charge which Nkunda denies. Amnesty International says his troops have abducted children as young as 12 and forced them to serve as child soldiers.

In May 2002, he was accused of massacring 160 people in Kisangani, prompting UN Human Rights Commissioner Mary Robinson to call for his arrest following the abduction and beating of two UN investigators by his troops. He has claimed that the UN have ignored the widespread attacks on Tutsis in the region as they did during the Rwandan genocide in 1994.

Child soldiers
The United Nations has identified Nkunda's CNDP as being one of the main groups responsible for the recruitment of child soldiers in the DRC. Nkunda denies these allegations, stating that as of 2005 he has demobilised 2,500 "young soldiers". His total army was estimated at 7,000–8,000 men.

Possible ouster
Nkunda may have been usurped in leadership by fellow general Bosco Ntaganda, who became the new representative of the group. The two might have had a falling out over a massacre of civilians perpetrated by Ntaganda's forces.

Capture and arrest
Nkunda was arrested on 22 January 2009 after he had crossed into Rwanda.  After unsuccessfully attempting to defeat the CNDP militarily, Congolese president Kabila made a deal with President Kagame of Rwanda to allow Rwandan soldiers into the DRC to uproot FDLR militants in exchange for Rwanda removing Nkunda. Rwandan officials have yet to say if he will be handed over to DR Congo, which has issued an international warrant for his arrest. A military spokesperson said he had been seized after sending three battalions to repel an advance by a joint Congolese-Rwandan force. The force was part of a joint Congolese-Rwandan operation which was launched to hunt Rwandan Hutu militiamen operating in DR Congo. Nkunda is currently being held at an undisclosed location in Rwanda. A Rwandan military spokesman has claimed, however, that Nkunda is being held at Gisenyi, a city in Rubavu district in the Western Province of Rwanda.

On 26 March 2010, the Rwandan Supreme Court ruled that his case could only be heard by a military court, since the military had been responsible for his apprehension. Nkunda's defence had sought in vain to have his detention declared illegal and he has yet to be charged with a crime.

References

Further reading

Stewart Andrew Scott.	Laurent Nkunda et la rébellion du Kivu : au coeur de la guerre congolaise. Paris : Karthala, (2008). 
Miller, Eric: "The Inability of Peacekeeping to Address the Security Dilemma," 2010. 
WOLTERS, S., 2007. Trouble in Eastern DRC: The Nkunda Factor. Pretoria: Institute for Security Studies

External links
Encounter with A Rebel Leader by David McDougall, CBC News, November 17, 2008
Interview with Radio France Internationale, October 2008 (in English)
Interview with Sunday Monitor, November 2008
Map of the region controlled by L. Nkunda
 Days after General Nkunda's arrest, doubts and disbelief reign in Rwanda by Josh Kron, Nation, February 4, 2009

1967 births
Living people
People from North Kivu
Democratic Republic of the Congo Pentecostals
Democratic Republic of the Congo politicians
Democratic Republic of the Congo rebels
Democratic Republic of the Congo people imprisoned abroad
Prisoners and detainees of Rwanda
Tutsi people
African warlords
21st-century Democratic Republic of the Congo people